The Jenko Award is a literary award in Slovenia awarded each year for the best poetry collection in Slovene published in the previous two years. It has been bestowed since 1986 by the Slovene Writers' Association. It is named after the 19th-century Slovene poet Simon Jenko.

References

Slovenian literary awards
Awards established in 1986